"Wake Me Up" is a song by Swedish DJ and record producer Avicii, released as the lead single from his debut studio album True, released on CD by PRMD Music and Island Records on 17 June 2013. "Wake Me Up" was written by Avicii, Mike Einziger, and American soul singer Aloe Blacc. Blacc also provides vocals for the track and Mike Einziger of Incubus provides acoustic guitar. Peter Dyer also provides keyboard on the song. Avicii introduced "Wake Me Up!" for the first time live on stage at the Ultra Music Festival in Miami. The experimental rendering (it was accompanied by a live band with instruments and vocalists, including Blacc, Einziger and Incubus members Ben Kenney on bass and José Pasillas on drums) reportedly confused and angered a section of the electronic dance festival community. Subsequently, Avicii achieved critical and commercial success with the release of the single worldwide. Avicii's "Wake Me Up" has been named as the highest charting dance track of the decade (2010-2019), sitting at No. 13 in the 100-strong list from the official UK Singles Chart. It is the only song to crack the Billboard Decade-End without making the top 3 during any week.

"Wake Me Up" reached number one in much of Europe and charted well in various countries. The song has been described as a "summer anthem" by Variance Magazine and, throughout the 2013 festival season, Avicii included it as part of the opening or closing sequence of his sets at EDC Las Vegas, EDC London, Tomorrowland, Creamfields, Electric Zoo and the iTunes Festival. Due to the success of the song, Blacc later released an acoustic version of "Wake Me Up" in his solo EP Wake Me Up. It was also released as a promotional stand-alone single on Interscope Records, made available online for downloads via iTunes. A separate music video was also made. The Blacc single also charted on various charts.

Background 
In an interview with the Daily Star, Avicii, who had previously labelled "Wake Me Up!" as "a fun experiment" during an exclusive chat with MTV UK, said: "I had a demo with Mac Davis singing, the guy who wrote some songs that were covered by Elvis Presley, but I needed another singer to do the parts. At the same time I was tipped off about doing another track with Aloe Blacc, and I started working on that track. When I was with Mike Einziger from Incubus, we came up with the chord progression and the melody for 'Wake Me Up!' but no real lyrics. None of us sing and we really needed to get that demo down and the only person I knew that lived in LA was Aloe, so I called him and he was free. Lyrics come really easy to him so he wrote them in a couple of hours and we finished the track."

Aloe Blacc, who is not credited on the track, explained to The Huffington Post: "I started writing the lyrics at the top of 2013, travelling back from Switzerland. I started in hip hop music back in the 90s and I never expected to be singing and have an actual career as a musician, but I'm travelling all over the world and I thought 'Life is a dream, wake me up when it's all over'. I was invited to the studio with Avicii and Mike Einziger from Incubus, and when I got to the studio they had already come up with a chord progression of the song. I came in with the lyrics and I just developed the melody as I heard the chords, and we all thought it was something very strong. We finished the song that night as an acoustic version, then Avicii made the dance mix in a couple of days, and that's what we released to the world, and that was his release." Blacc later released an acoustic version of the song which was included on his solo EP Wake Me Up. It was also released as a promotional stand-alone single by Interscope Records and made available online for download via iTunes. The single also charted in its own right in various charts.

Composition 
"Wake Me Up" is a folktronica song, blending elements of EDM, soul and country music. Musically, it is written in the key of B minor and runs at 124 beats per minute (BPM). It follows a chord progression of Bm/G/D/A – Bm/G/D/F#.

Critical reception 
Robert Copsey of Digital Spy gave the song a positive review, stating:
"As chart-friendly EDM continues to reach the furthest corners of the globe, staying ahead of the pack can prove a tricky task – especially when more and more acts arrive on the scene turning out mixes with identikit build-ups, tired lyrics and uninspired breakdowns that newcomers to the arena lap up with excitement. Kudos to Avicii then, who has dared to try something a little different for his latest offering. "So wake me up when it's all over/ When I'm wiser and I'm older," featured artist Aloe Blacc sings over dialled-up, country-flecked guitar strums that sound like Mumford & Sons on speed. The jig-along chorus may conjure up images of Brits-on-tour, but to be honest, what summer anthem doesn't?" .
At the end of the year, Rolling Stone listed "Wake Me Up" at number 26 on its list of 100 Best Songs of 2013

Commercial performance 
The single has peaked at number one in 22 countries to date, including Australia, New Zealand, Hungary, Ireland, the United Kingdom and several European countries, in addition to reaching the top 10 in six others. The song is also the most searched on the Apple owned music identifying app Shazam with more than 23 million in February 2018.

In Australia, the song debuted at number 42 on 24 June, before reaching the two spot two weeks later making it both Avicii's and Blacc's highest-charting single in the country. Prior to reaching the top spot, Robin Thicke's, "Blurred Lines" spent eight weeks atop the chart. On its sixth week at the top, 12 August, "Wake Me Up" became the longest-running number one by a Swedish act since Roxette's 1989 hit "The Look". In Ireland, "Wake Me Up" spent seven consecutive weeks at number one. "Wake Me Up!" has performed well in the North American music markets, having peaked in Canada and the United States at number two and number four, respectively.  It spent 21 weeks in the top ten of the Billboard Hot 100, and 54 non-consecutive weeks overall, making it the first Dance/Electronic song to stay over a year on that chart. It also reached number one position in the 7 September 2013 issue of Billboard's Dance/Mix Show Airplay Chart.  In Canada it was the second best-selling song of 2013 with 519,000 copies sold (523,000 for all versions combined).  It is the first dance/electronic song to sell over 4 million copies in the U.S., and as of August 2015 it has sold over 4,060,000 copies.

In July 2013, "Wake Me Up" entered at the number one on the UK Singles Chart, becoming Avicii's second UK number one and selling 88,000 copies in its first day and 267,000 in its first week, becoming Britain's fastest-selling single of 2013 at the time of writing. Following three weeks at number one, "Wake Me Up" spent a further four consecutive weeks at number two, and a total of 11 consecutive weeks in the top ten. By October 2013, the single had sold over 1 million copies in the UK, becoming the 140th single to do so in UK chart history and the third single of 2013 to do so. "Wake Me Up" was also the fifth most streamed track of 2013 in the UK. The song also spent nine consecutive weeks at number one on the UK Dance Chart until being replaced by Avicii's next single "You Make Me".

Music videos 
A lyric video to accompany the release of "Wake Me Up" was first released on YouTube 28 June 2013, at a total length of four minutes and thirty two seconds, and teaser clips for the official video were also released.

The official video for "Wake Me Up" was released a month after the lyric video on 29 July 2013. It was directed by celebrity photographer Mark Seliger and co-directed and edited by CB "Barney" Miller (former guitarist for 1980's pop band Miller Miller Miller & Sloan). It features a woman and a young girl, clearly sisters: The older woman is Russian fashion model Kristina Romanova, and the younger girl is Laneya Grace. It depicts them and how they are different from the people in their dreary village, said people are seen looking at the two often with disgust and revulsion except for one of them. One morning, Kristina gets up early and rides off on a horse to a nearby city. Once in the city, she finds how welcoming and accepting the people are of her. She notices a woman with the Avicii logo birthmark like the one on her lower arm. They meet others and then jump into a truck and are then shown to be attending an Avicii concert. The next morning, Kristina rides back home on the horse and tells Laneya that she found "somewhere they belong" as they pack up all their belongings and depart the village for good. The video ends with them walking down the highway as they move into the city and shots from the concert and one of the staring villagers from the beginning seeming to notice and depressed by the sisters' departure before resuming her uninspired life. The video includes product placement from Denim & Supply by Ralph Lauren and the Sony Xperia Z smartphone, used to capture a group selfie at the concert. The video was shot by the Santa Clara River orange groves and in the town of Piru, California, north west of Los Angeles, as well as Downtown LA. Avicii concert footage was from Miami. As of January 2023, the video has 2.2 billion views on Avicii's official YouTube channel, making it one of the 60 most viewed videos on the site. 

In addition, his own channel Avicii collaborated with the YouTube channel "Yo Mama" to produce the official music video for the single on his AVICII by AVICII album. It was directed by Zachary James and Alex Negrete.

Track listing 
Digital download
"Wake Me Up" – 4:09
"Wake Me Up" (Mr. Worldwide Remix) – 3:38

Digital download — remixes
"Wake Me Up" (Avicii Speed remix) – 7:04
"Wake Me Up" (reggae mix) – 4:31

Digital download — remixes
"Wake Me Up" (Avicii Speed remix) – 7:04
"Wake Me Up" (original extended mix) – 5:44
"Wake Me Up" (reggae remix) – 4:31

Digital download — remixes (part 2)
"Wake Me Up" (PANG! Slow Things Down remix) – 6:12
"Wake Me Up" (EDX Miami Sunset remix) – 6:32

CD single
"Wake Me Up" (radio edit) – 4:09
"Wake Me Up" (instrumental) – 4:32

Credits 
Personnel
 Avicii – songwriter, producer
 Aloe Blacc – lead vocals, songwriter
 Arash Pournouri – co-producer
 Mike Einziger – guitar, songwriter
 Peter Dyer – keyboards

Adapted from CD single and BMI website.

Charts

Weekly charts

Year-end charts

Decade-end charts

All-time charts

Certifications

Release history

Acoustic version

On 30 September 2013, Blacc released his own acoustic version of the song. The track appeared in the Wake Me Up EP as track number two in the 5-track EP. "Wake Me Up (Acoustic)" was released as a promotional stand-alone single on Interscope Records and made available online for downloads via iTunes. The track also appears on Blacc's full studio album Lift Your Spirit.

Music video 
In October 2013, Blacc released the music video for "Wake Me Up". Blacc collaborated with the immigrant rights group National Day Laborer Organizing Network and the ABC* Foundation's Healing Power of Music Initiative. The director is Alex Rivera. The cast were real life immigrant activists: Hareth Andrade Ayala (a Virginia leader in the immigrant youth movement working to stop her own father's deportation), Agustin Chiprez Alvarez (a Los Angeles day laborer), and Margarita Reyes (who was deported with her mother as a child despite being born in the US).

Chart performance

Weekly charts

Year-end charts

Cover versions

Tebey version

"Wake Me Up" was covered in the style of country music in 2013 by Canadian country singer Tebey featuring Canadian country band Emerson Drive. This version was released to digital retailers via TebeyMusic on 27 November 2013 as the third single from the former's second studio album, Two (2014) before impacting radio in January 2014. The song was released in the US on 28 January 2014 through The Talent Associates. It has been well received by Canadian country radio, peaking at  5 on the Canada Country airplay chart. The song is also included on Tebey's 2016 EP, Old School.

Track listing

Chart performance 
"Wake Me Up", as performed by Tebey and Emerson Drive, entered the Canadian Hot 100 at No. 63 for the week ending 1 February 2014. It peaked at No. 56 for the week ending 29 March 2014, which position it held for one chart week.

Weekly charts

Certifications

Britton Buchanan and Alicia Keys version

"Wake Me Up" was covered by American recording artists Alicia Keys and Britton Buchanan during Season 14 of the singing competition The Voice. Buchanan and Keys performed the song as a tribute to Avicii who had died a little over a month earlier. Studio version of the song was released as a single on 21 May 2018 through Republic Records. The song appears on Buchanan's album The Complete Season 14 Collection (The Voice Performance).

Track listing

Live performance 
Buchanan and Keys performed the song live on the Season 14 finale of The Voice on 21 May 2018. They performed a stripped down rendition of the song and dedicated their performance to Avicii, with Keys saying "This one's for you Avicii! We're celebrating life, love and finding ourselves!". Amanda Bell of Entertainment Weekly wrote that "his whimpering tones are a good match for this piece, and her ability to break away is always pretty strong" but concluded that the performance was "still a bit boring".

Spark Productions cover 
In the United Kingdom, the original release date was intended to be 8 September 2013. In the absence of the original, a group called "Spark Productions" took advantage and released a cover version of it; this version reached number 26 on the UK Singles Chart before Avicii conceded to public demand and decided to release it early, with the Official Charts Company announcing on 15 July 2013 that it would be released that week.

Other notable covers 
A cover of the song in Irish was uploaded onto YouTube on 9 August 2013, by TG Lurgan, a music project by Irish-language summer college Coláiste Lurgan. The video received heavy publicity and popularity within Ireland from many news websites and the public. The video was a viral hit within the country and with Irish abroad, hitting a million views in one week.

British band You Me at Six made a country version for BBC Radio 1's Live Lounge. James Shotwel commented that their cover "will be pulling at your heart strings all day long. The once fun-loving track has taken a turn for the melancholy, but it plays so well you'll hardly think twice about the change."

Jessica Mauboy covered the song on 14 October 2016 For her 2016 album, The Secret Daughter: Songs from the Original TV Series. It reached number 34 on the Australian ARIA Singles Chart.

Children in Need 2014 version 

Performed by Gareth Malone's All Star Choir, the song was released as the official BBC Children in Need single for 2014. Choirmaster and broadcaster Gareth Malone has previously had chart success after putting together non-singers and turning them into a cohesive choir. In 2011, he guided the Military Wives – a group of women with partners serving overseas in the army – to Christmas number one with the song "Wherever You Are". In 2012, in collaboration with Gary Barlow, Malone produced the song "Sing", as part of the Diamond Jubilee celebrations, with the Commonwealth Band being joined by the Military Wives.

Malone was chosen to create the official Children in Need single for 2014, and his efforts were captured in a two-part series, Gareth Malone's All Star Choir, which aired on 3 November and 10 November. The BBC press release said that Malone would "bring together an array of untrained voices from the world of television sport and theatre" for the single.

The celebrities that make up the All Star Choir are Margaret Alphonsi, Jo Brand, Radzi Chinyanganya, John Craven, Mel Giedroyc, Nitin Ganatra, Larry Lamb, Alice Levine, Fabrice Muamba, Craig Revel Horwood, Linda Robson and Alison Steadman.

Promotion and live performances 
Gareth Malone went on numerous television and radio shows to promote the song, including some presented by celebrities who feature on the record. This included spots on Loose Women, Blue Peter, The One Show and Alice Levine's afternoon show on Radio 1.

Chart performance 
After its release on 9 November, the song was placed at number 1 on the midweek Official Chart Update on Radio 1, ahead of "Thinking Out Loud" by Ed Sheeran and Cheryl's "I Don't Care", which was number one the previous weekend.

See also 

 List of Airplay 100 number ones of the 2010s
 List of best-selling singles
 List of best-selling singles in Australia
 List of best-selling singles in the United States
 List of million-selling singles in the United Kingdom
 List of Billboard Hot 100 top 10 singles in 2013
 List of number-one singles of 2013 (Australia)
 List of number-one hits of 2013 (Austria)
 List of number-one hits of 2013 (Denmark)
 List of top 10 singles in 2013 (France)
 List of number-one hits of 2013 (Germany)
 List of number-one singles of 2013 (Ireland)
 List of number-one hits of 2013 (Italy)
 List of number-one songs of 2013 (Mexico)
 List of number-one singles from the 2010s (New Zealand)
 List of number-one singles of 2013 (Poland)
 List of number-one hits of 2013 (Scotland)
 List of number-one singles of 2013 (Spain)
 List of number-one hits of 2013 (Switzerland)
 List of UK Singles Chart number ones of the 2010s
 List of number-one dance singles of 2013 (U.S.)
 Hedonism

References 

2013 songs
2013 singles
Avicii songs
Aloe Blacc songs
Song recordings produced by Avicii
Dutch Top 40 number-one singles
Emerson Drive songs
Tebey songs
Irish Singles Chart number-one singles
UK Singles Chart number-one singles
Number-one singles in Australia
Folktronica songs
Interscope Records singles
Island Records singles
Decca Records singles
Republic Records singles
Number-one singles in Denmark
Number-one singles in Finland
SNEP Top Singles number-one singles
Number-one singles in Germany
Number-one singles in Greece
Number-one singles in Hungary
Number-one singles in Israel
Number-one singles in Italy
Number-one singles in Norway
Number-one singles in Poland
Number-one singles in Romania
Number-one singles in Russia
Number-one singles in Scotland
Number-one singles in Sweden
Record Report Pop Rock General number-one singles
Songs written by Aloe Blacc
Songs written by Avicii
Songs written by Mike Einziger
Country music songs